In algebraic geometry, there are various generalizations of the Riemann–Roch theorem; among the most famous is the Grothendieck–Riemann–Roch theorem, which is further generalized by the formulation due to Fulton et al.

Formulation due to Baum, Fulton and MacPherson 
Let  and  be functors on the category C of schemes separated and locally of finite type over the base field k with proper morphisms such that
 is the Grothendieck group of coherent sheaves on X,
 is the rational Chow group of X,
for each proper morphism f,  are the direct images (or push-forwards) along f.

Also, if  is a (global) local complete intersection morphism; i.e., it factors as a closed regular embedding  into a smooth scheme P followed by a smooth morphism , then let

be the class in the Grothendieck group of vector bundles on X; it is independent of the factorization and is called the virtual tangent bundle of f.

Then the Riemann–Roch theorem amounts to the construction of a unique natural transformation:

between the two functors such that for each scheme X in C, the homomorphism  satisfies: for a local complete intersection morphism , when there are closed embeddings  into smooth schemes,

where  refers to the Todd class.

Moreover, it has the properties:
it X is a closed subscheme of a smooth scheme M, then the theorem is (roughly) the restriction of the theorem in the smooth case and can be written down in terms of a localized Chern class.

The equivariant Riemann–Roch theorem 

Over the complex numbers, the theorem is (or can be interpreted as) a special case of the equivariant index theorem.

The Riemann–Roch theorem for Deligne–Mumford stacks 
Aside from algebraic spaces, no straightforward generalization is possible for stacks. The complication already appears in the orbifold case (Kawasaki's Riemann–Roch).

The equivariant Riemann–Roch theorem for finite groups is equivalent in many situations to the Riemann–Roch theorem for quotient stacks by finite groups.

One of the significant applications of the theorem is that it allows one to define a virtual fundamental class in terms of the K-theoretic virtual fundamental class.

See also 
Kawasaki's Riemann–Roch formula

Notes

References 

 

Vakil, Math 245A Topics in algebraic geometry: Introduction to intersection theory in algebraic geometry

External links 
https://mathoverflow.net/questions/25218/why-is-riemann-roch-for-stacks-so-hard

Algebraic geometry